Teleiodes flavipunctatella is a moth of the family Gelechiidae. It is found in Korea.

The wingspan is 11–15 mm. The forewing ground colour and markings are similar to Carpatolechia yangyangensis, with a well-developed yellow patch at the middle of the cell, several dark fuscous scale tufts and three to four scale tufts anterior and above the yellow patch, often mixed with yellowish and white scales. The hindwings are grey. Adults are on wing from mid-May to mid-August.

References

Moths described in 1992
Teleiodes